Trinity—Spadina was a provincial electoral district in Ontario, Canada, that was represented in the Legislative Assembly of Ontario since 1999.

The electoral district was created in 1999 when provincial ridings were defined to have the same borders as federal ridings. It generally encompasses the western portion of Downtown Toronto. In the 2001 Canadian census, the riding had 106,094 people of which 74,409 were eligible to vote.

Its Member of Provincial Parliament (MPP) elect is Chris Glover of the Ontario New Democratic Party, who unseated short lived MPP Han Dong in the 2018 general election.

Major landmarks within the riding include the western portion of the University of Toronto, the CN Tower, Rogers Centre (formerly Skydome), Air Canada Centre, the Canadian Broadcasting Centre, 299 Queen Street West, the Toronto Eaton Centre, the Metro Toronto Convention Centre, Toronto City Hall, Kensington Market, Chinatown, Christie Pits, Trinity Bellwoods Park and Palmerston Boulevard.

The riding is one of the most ethnically diverse in Canada containing the heart of Toronto's Chinatown, Koreatown, Little Italy and Little Portugal. The northern section of the riding is the trendy Annex district, while the eastern edge contains part of the University of Toronto and thousands of students. The riding has been the most left-leaning in Toronto and has voted NDP provincially for a number of years.

In 2018, the district was dissolved into Spadina—Fort York, University—Rosedale and Toronto Centre.

Demographics
Average family income: $81,415  
Median family income: $50,047  
Unemployment:    6.7% 
Language : English - 51%, French - 2%, Other - 45%, Multiple  - 2% 
Language : English only - 75.3%, French only - < 0.1%, English and French - 15.4%, Neither English nor French - 9.1% 
Religion: Catholic - 32.1%, Protestant - 15%, other Christian  - 5.3%, Buddhist - 5.2%, Jewish - 4.2%, Muslim - 2.8%, No religious affiliation - 32.9%, Other - 2.4% 
Visible Minority: Chinese - 18.2%, Black - 4%, South Asian - 3.5%, Southeast Asian - 1.8%, Filipino - 1.7%, Korean - 1.5%, Latin American - 1.5%, Others - 3.3% 
Immigrant Status: Non-immigrant - 52%, Immigrant - 45%, Non-permanent resident - 3%

Geography
It consists of the Toronto Islands and the part of the City of Toronto bounded on the south by Toronto Harbour, and on the west, north and east by a line drawn from the harbour north on Spencer Avenue, east along the Gardiner Expressway, north on Dufferin, east on Queen Street West, southeast along the Canadian Pacific Railway line, north along Dovercourt Road, east along Dundas Street West, north along Ossington Avenue, east along the Canadian Pacific Railway situated north of Dupont Street, south along Avenue Road and Queens Park Crescent West, east along College Street and south along Yonge Street to the Harbour.

These borders were changed in the 2004 redistribution.  The northwestern corner, a generally pro-NDP area was lost to Davenport.  A large, but mostly business area of Toronto Centre—Rosedale between University Avenue and Yonge St. was added to the riding.  This region tends to support the Liberals.  The Toronto Islands were also added to the riding from Toronto Centre—Rosedale. This area is very strongly NDP and while it has a small population it is a highly activist one that provides many campaign workers for the New Democrats.

Members of Provincial Parliament

Election results

2007 electoral reform referendum

 This riding was one of five ridings where a majority of voters supported MMP.

City Councillors
Municipally, Trinity—Spadina is divided into two wards; the western half, Ward 19, is represented by Mike Layton (son of the late and former Canadian federal New Democratic leader Jack Layton), and the eastern half, Ward 20, is represented by Ceta Ramkhalawansingh. In Toronto's 2010 municipal elections, Adam Vaughan was re-elected for a second four-year term; the previous Ward 19 Councillor, Joe Pantalone, stood (unsuccessfully) for mayor. Ramkhalawansingh was appointed by Council after Vaughan ran successfully in the 2014 Ontario election.

Metro Ward 20
 Joe Pantalone 1980–January 1, 1998

Metro Ward 24
 Olivia Chow - 1991–January 1, 1998

Toronto Ward 24
 Olivia Chow - Metro Council Ward 24 1998-2000

Toronto Ward 19
 Joe Pantalone January 1, 1998 – 2010
 Mike Layton 2010-
Toronto Ward 20
 Olivia Chow - 2000–2006; 2006
 Martin Silva 2006
 Adam Vaughan 2006–2014
 Ceta Ramkhalawansingh 2014–present

Toronto Ward 4
 Martin Silva 1988–January 1, 1998
 William Peyton Hubbard 1894–1915

Toronto Ward 5
 Dan Leckie January 1, 1994 – January 1, 1998

References

Sources
Elections Ontario Past Election Results

Provincial electoral districts of Toronto